Tracey Pemberton (born 4 June 1981) is an Australian netball player. She played for the West Coast Fever in the ANZ Championship, previously playing for the Perth Orioles in the Commonwealth Bank Trophy.

References
2008 West Coast Fever team profile. Retrieved on 2008-07-18.
2008 ANZ Championship profile. Retrieved on 2008-07-18.

1981 births
Living people
Australian netball players
West Coast Fever players
ANZ Championship players
Perth Orioles players
Netball players from Western Australia